Colonel Arthur Howe Browne, 8th Marquess of Sligo, KBE (8 May 1867 – 28 May 1951), styled Arthur Howe Browne until 1903 and Lord Arthur Browne between 1903 and 1941, was an Irish soldier and peer.

Life and career
Browne was the third son of Henry Browne, 5th Marquess of Sligo, and Catherine Henrietta Dicken, daughter of William Stephens Dicken. He was educated at Windlesham House School from 1877 to 1880 and thereafter at Clifton College.

In 1903 his father succeeded an elder brother as Marquess, and he received the courtesy style, Lord Arthur Browne. Late in his life in 1941, he himself succeeded to the marquessate on the early death of his nephew.

After a period as a lieutenant in the militia, Browne came first in the competitive examinations for the Regular Army and was commissioned second lieutenant on 8 June 1889 in the Royal Munster Fusiliers. He was promoted to lieutenant on 30 December 1891 and served as a transport officer in the Tirah Campaign 1897–1898, following which he was promoted to captain on 27 August 1898. He served with the 1st Battalion of his regiment in South Africa during the Second Boer war. At the end of the war in 1902, he went with the battalion to India. More than 520 officers and men left Cape Town on the SS Lake Manitoba in September 1902, arriving at Bombay the following month. He was then stationed at Multan in Punjab. He received his majority in 1907 and served in the Great War as a colonel on the staff of the Directorate of Intelligence at the War Office.

From 1919 to 1930, Browne was the Principal Assistant Secretary of the Imperial War Graves Commission. In 1923, he wrote:

A 2021 report commented that his response showed "what he may have considered foresight, but one that was explicitly framed by contemporary racial prejudice". The report continues in the light of the lack of memorials and gravestones for non-white soldiers: "Underpinning all these decisions, however, were the entrenched prejudices, preconceptions and pervasive racism of contemporary imperial attitudes".

Family
Lord Sligo married Lillian Whiteside Chapman, daughter of Charles Chapman, on 18 November 1910. He died in May 1951, aged 84, and was succeeded by his younger brother, Lord Terence Browne.

Lord Sligo's funeral was described by his nephew, the 10th Marquess:

References

Further reading
 Twilight of the Ascendancy, Mark Bence-Jones, p. 254, London, 1959.

1867 births
1951 deaths
20th-century Anglo-Irish people
Arthur
Earls of Clanricarde
People educated at Clifton College
Knights Commander of the Order of the British Empire
Arthur
Military personnel from County Mayo
People educated at Windlesham House School
Royal Munster Fusiliers officers
Irish people of World War I